Greeley Township is a township in Saline County, Kansas, in the United States.

Greeley Township was organized in 1879.

References

Townships in Saline County, Kansas
Townships in Kansas
1879 establishments in Kansas
Populated places established in 1879